The siege of Fredriksten was an attack on the Norwegian fortress of Fredriksten in the city of Fredrikshald (now Halden) by King Charles XII of Sweden.  While inspecting his troops' lines, Charles XII was killed by a projectile.  The Swedes broke off the siege, and the Norwegians held the fortress.  Along with the Treaty of Nystad three years later, the death of Charles XII marked the end of the imperial era in Sweden, and the beginning of the Age of Liberty  in that country.

Background 

King Charles XII of Sweden made several campaigns into the city during the Great Northern War (Swedish: Stora nordiska kriget) as part of his campaign to capture Norway. At the close of the Great Northern War, the Norwegian Army had been weakened in early 1716 by withdrawal of 5000 of the best troops to Denmark. When rumors reached Christiania (now Oslo) that Charles XII was preparing to invade, all remaining troops in Østerdal and Gudbrandsdal were ordered to the border at Halden and Fredrikstad. The Norwegians expected Swedish forces to invade at Kongsvinger, Basmo and/or Halden. 

It was at Basmo Fortress (Basmo festning) where Charles struck, crossing the border March 8, 1716.  The Norwegian scorched earth policy and guerrilla raid interdiction of supply chains by the residents of Bohuslen deprived Charles of supplies, while the fortresses still held by the Norwegians behind his lines threatened his supply chain. Charles took Christiania (now Oslo), but without heavy siege artillery, was unable to take Akershus Fortress.

After a brief occupation, Charles retraced his steps to the Norwegian fortresses in southeastern Norway with the objective of capturing Frederiksten. This would remove the threat at his back, and the fortifications could serve as the base for a renewed offensive later that year. Capturing the harbours at the mouth of the Glomma river would also allow him to land the necessary provisions for a successful siege of Akershus Fortress. 

Charles' troops attempted to take Frederiksten by storm on July 4th. His troops took the town after fierce fighting, but the citizens set fire to their own houses, forcing Charles, unable to take the fortress, to retreat and await the arrival of heavy siege guns. Unfortunately for the invading army the entire Swedish transport fleet was captured or destroyed by the Norwegian naval hero Peter Wessel Tordenskjold (1690-1720) at the Battle of Dynekilen (Slaget om Dynekilen) in Bohuslen. Running low on supplies, Charles retreated hastily across the Svinesund and burned the bridges behind him. By July 12, 1716 all Swedish troops had been withdrawn from the area around Fredriksten.

Siege of 1718 
Charles came again to besiege the fortress in autumn of 1718 with 40,000 men. He did this intending to first capture  Fredriksten fortress to be able to sustain a siege of Akershus. By first taking the border areas, Charles wished to avoid a repeat of the fiasco he had suffered two years before. The 1,400 strong garrison of Frederiksten fought ferociously to hold back the invasion, but suffered a severe setback when, on December 8th the forward fortification, Gyldenløve fort,  at Fredriksten fell. Encouraged by their very hard-fought success the Swedish army intensified their efforts against the main fort.

The Swedish trenches had almost reached the main fortification walls when on the evening of December 11th  (Swedish calendar: November 30), 1718, a projectile (probably a large musket ball or grapeshot) struck Charles XII through the left temple while he inspected the trench-works and killed him. The death of the king effectively ended the attack on Fredriksten and the invasion was called off, leading to the conclusion of the war.

References

Related reading
Åberg. Alf;  Göte Göransson  (1976) Karoliner   (Stockholm : Bokförl. Trevi) 
 Bain, R. Nisbet (2015) Charles XII and the Collapse of the Swedish Empire (CreateSpace Independent Publishing) 
Frost,  Robert I. (2000)  The Northern Wars,  1558-1721 (Longman Harlowd)  
 Lisk, Jill (1968) The Struggle for Supremacy in the Baltic 1600-1725  (Funk & Wagnalls)
 Lunde, Henrik O. (2014) A Warrior Dynasty: The Rise and Fall of Sweden as a Military Superpower, 1611-1721 (Casemate) 
 Stagg, Frank Noel (1956)  East Norway and its Frontier (George Allen & Unwin, Ltd)
Stiles, Andrina (1992)  Sweden and the Baltic, 1523 - 1721 (Hodder & Stoughton)  

Fellin
Fellin
Castles in Norway
Forts in Norway
Buildings and structures in Østfold
Halden
Fredriksten
History of Bohuslän
1718 in Norway
Conflicts in 1718